Commensalibacter is a genus of Gram-negative, aerobic and rod-shaped bacteria from the family of Acetobacteraceae which was originally isolated from Drosophila melanogaster. The complete genome of the type strain C. intestini A911 has been sequenced.

Although originally isolated from Drosophila melanogaster, Commensalibacter intestini has been also found in honey bees and bumblebees.

References 

Rhodospirillales
Bacteria genera
Monotypic bacteria genera
Taxa described in 2008